The 1977–78 Bundesliga was the 15th season of the Bundesliga, West Germany's premier football league. It began on 6 August 1977 and ended on 29 April 1978. Borussia Mönchengladbach were the defending champions.

Competition modus
Every team played two games against each other team, one at home and one away. Teams received two points for a win and one point for a draw. If two or more teams were tied on points, places were determined by goal difference and, if still tied, by goals scored. The team with the most points were crowned champions while the three teams with the fewest points were relegated to their respective 2. Bundesliga divisions.

Team changes to 1976–77
Karlsruher SC, Tennis Borussia Berlin and Rot-Weiss Essen were relegated to the 2. Bundesliga after finishing in the last three places. They were replaced by FC St. Pauli, winners of the 2. Bundesliga Northern Division, VfB Stuttgart, winners of the Southern Division and TSV 1860 Munich, who won a promotion play-off series against Arminia Bielefeld.

Season overview
The 1977–78 season, which ended earlier than usual due to the upcoming World Cup in Argentina, ended with 1. FC Köln winning the title, but the decision had been closer than anybody would have imagined. The team from Cologne was level on points with Borussia Mönchengladbach before the final round of matches of the season, but had a ten-goal lead in goal difference over their rivals. Nevertheless, Mönchengladbach managed to close the gap with a 12–0 victory in their last match against Borussia Dortmund. However, the team around Jupp Heynckes and Berti Vogts missed out on the title by three goals because Köln won 5–0 against FC St. Pauli at the same time.

Team overview

League table

Results

Top goalscorers
24 goals
  Dieter Müller (1. FC Köln)
  Gerd Müller (FC Bayern Munich)

21 goals
  Klaus Toppmöller (1. FC Kaiserslautern)

20 goals
  Manfred Burgsmüller (Borussia Dortmund)
  Klaus Fischer (FC Schalke 04)

18 goals
  Jupp Heynckes (Borussia Mönchengladbach)

17 goals
  Karl-Heinz Granitza (Hertha BSC)
  Allan Simonsen (Borussia Mönchengladbach)

16 goals
  Franz Gerber (FC St. Pauli)
  Rudolf Seliger (MSV Duisburg)

Champion squad

References

External links
 DFB Bundesliga archive 1977/1978

Bundesliga seasons
1
Germany